Washington, Wisconsin may refer to:

 Washington County, Wisconsin
 Washington Island, Door County, Wisconsin, a town
 Washington (community), Wisconsin, an unincorporated community in Door County
 Washington, Eau Claire County, Wisconsin, a town
 Washington, Green County, Wisconsin, a town
 Washington, La Crosse County, Wisconsin, a town
 Washington, Rusk County, Wisconsin, a town
 Washington, Sauk County, Wisconsin, a town
 Washington, Shawano County, Wisconsin, a town
 Washington, Vilas County, Wisconsin, a town

See also
 Port Washington, Wisconsin, a city
 Port Washington (town), Wisconsin, a town
 Washington Island (Wisconsin), an island in Lake Michigan